János Biri (21 July 1901 – 29 March 1983) was a Hungarian footballer and coach. Biri played as a goalkeeper for a number of clubs, most notably Padova and MTK Budapest FC, also representing Hungary in the 1924 Summer Olympics. He is best known for his coaching career in Portugal which spanned more than three decades.

Career

Born in Budapest, Biri career in football started in a hometown club, Kispest AC at the age of 19. His performances earned him a place in the Hungary squad for the 1924 Summer Olympics. In 1925, he moved to Italy, representing Padova in the early days of what was to known as Serie A. After two seasons in Italy, he returned to Hungary, passing through several teams, without much success, having short spells in France and Portugal, retiring in 1936, at age 35.

Shortly after, Biri started coaching Porto, winning Campeonato de Porto and coming runner-up in Primeira Liga in his only season there. After a brief spell with Académico Porto, he was then hired by Benfica's President, Augusto da Fonseca Jr. In the eight seasons he spent there, he successfully challenged Sporting dominance, claiming 3 Primeira Liga titles and 3 Taça de Portugal.

He held the record for most games managed and won, for over 75 years, until Jorge Jesus surpassed him in 2014. However, he still has the highest winning percentage of any other coach with at least 100 games and the second longest reign with 8 years, after Cosme Damião. After Benfica, János managed eleven other teams, retiring as coach in 1966, after more than 30 years in managerial roles.

Managerial Record

Honours
Porto
Campeonato do Porto: 1935–36

Benfica
Primeira Liga: 1941–42, 1942–43, 1944–45
Taça de Portugal: 1939–40, 1942–43, 1943–44 
Campeonato de Lisboa: 1939–40

References

External links 

1901 births
1983 deaths
Association football goalkeepers
Hungarian footballers
Budapest Honvéd FC players
Calcio Padova players
MTK Budapest FC players
Amiens SC players
Boavista F.C. players
Hungarian football managers
Expatriate football managers in Portugal
FC Porto managers
S.L. Benfica managers
G.D. Estoril Praia managers
Vitória S.C. managers
Vitória F.C. managers
S.C. Lusitânia managers
Associação Académica de Coimbra – O.A.F. managers
Hungary international footballers
Footballers at the 1924 Summer Olympics
Olympic footballers of Hungary
Footballers from Budapest